The Permian Basin Shooting Stars were a soccer club based in Odessa, Texas that competed in the SISL and USISL. For the 1991/92 indoor season, the team was renamed the Permian Basin Mirage.

Year-by-year

Defunct soccer clubs in Texas
USISL teams
Defunct indoor soccer clubs in the United States
1989 establishments in Texas
Association football clubs established in 1989
1992 disestablishments in Texas
Association football clubs disestablished in 1992
Sports in Odessa, Texas